The Independent Christian Trade Unions of Slovakia (NKOS) is a trade union center in Slovakia. It has a membership of 10,000 in three affiliated unions. Independent Christian Unions of Slovakia (NKOS) are an Open Union Confederation, based on Christian principles of democracy and humanism, registered at the Ministry of Interior of the Slovak republic on 26 May 1993 by law no. 83/1990 Zb. about Association of Citizens, as amended.
History of NKOS
In the years 1920 -1940 Christian unions were a significant factor in the state. They were called the Slovak Christian-social trade association. Their activity was forcibly closed in 1948. After the Velvet Revolution in 1989, an effort to restore their activity emerged. In 1990 the first Christian workers' clubs were created. Then came Christian Unions of Slovakia. Christian trade unionists efforts culminated on 26 March 1993 when NKOS were registered at the Ministry of Interior, their chairman was prof. Milan Katuninec. In 1994 the first NKOS trade union, railways, was created, with the chairman Joseph Micsinai and two years later the Trade Union of Workers in Education and Science of Slovakia came into existence with its first chairman Vladimir Cinderella. In 1995, a trade union KOVO METAL was founded, its first chairman was Dušan Mihalik. In December 1994, NKOS became a member of the International Labour Organisation. They became an observer of ITUC on the Compounding Congress in Vienna in 2006.

Social dialogue, Collective bargaining and Collective agreements
Sectoral collective agreements are concluded between NKOS and associations of employers by various sectors of the economy in which they adjust the framework institutes on working time, wage growth, holidays, creation of social fund, or other industrial institutes and so on.

NKOS collectively bargain and sign higher level collective agreements:
• Sectoral collective agreement in civil service.
• Sectoral collective agreement for employers, who proceed with remuneration ac-cording to the law no. 553 / 2003 Z.z. on remuneration of certain employees per-forming work in public interest.
• Sectoral collective agreement between the Trade Union KOVO, Independent Christian Trade Unions of Slovakia and The Association of Metallurgy, Mining Industry and Geology of the Slovak Republic.

The basis of strengthening social dialogue in the workplace is collective bargaining that results in an enterprise (organisational) collective agreement. Basic organisations of NKOS through the enterprise collective agreement improve labor, social and living conditions of the employee's at the specific workplace.

At the national level, together with the representative organisations working in the education and science, we signed the joint Declaration of the Trade Union of Workers in Education and Science of Slovakia and partner representations working in education to promote the improvement of the conditions and level of education and science in the Slovak Republic.

Slovak legislation gives majority unions monopoly power to negotiate and conclude collective agreements. This power has limited the ability of the NKOS to advance in the country.

The NKOS is affiliated with the International Trade Union Confederation.

References

External links
 NKOS official site.

Trade unions in Slovakia
International Trade Union Confederation